Jamaica Kincaid (born May 25, 1949) is an Antiguan-American novelist, essayist, gardener, and gardening writer. She was born in St. John's, Antigua (part of the twin-island nation of Antigua and Barbuda). She lives in North Bennington, Vermont and is Professor of African and African American Studies in Residence at Harvard University during the academic year.

Biography

Early life
Jamaica Kincaid was born Elaine Potter Richardson in St John's, Antigua, on May 25, 1949. She grew up in relative poverty with her mother, a literate, cultured woman and homemaker, and her stepfather, a carpenter. She was very close to her mother until her three brothers were born in quick succession, starting when Kincaid was nine years old. After her brothers' births, she resented her mother, who thereafter focused primarily on the brothers' needs. Kincaid later recalled,

Our family money remained the same, but there were more people to feed and to clothe, and so everything got sort of shortened, not only material things but emotional things. The good emotional things, I got a short end of that. But then I got more of things I didn't have, like a certain kind of cruelty and neglect.

In a New York Times interview, Kincaid also said: "The way I became a writer was that my mother wrote my life for me and told it to me."

Kincaid received (and frequently excelled in) a British education growing up, as Antigua did not gain independence from the United Kingdom until 1981. Although she was intelligent and frequently tested at the top of her class, Kincaid's mother removed her from school at 16 to help support the family when her third and last brother was born, because her stepfather was ill and could no longer provide for the family. In 1966, when Kincaid was 17, her mother sent her to Scarsdale, a wealthy suburb of New York City, to work as an au pair. After this move, Kincaid refused to send money home; "she left no forwarding address and was cut off from her family until her return to Antigua 20 years later".

Family
In 1979, Kincaid married the composer and Bennington College professor Allen Shawn, son of longtime The New Yorker editor William Shawn and brother of actor Wallace Shawn. The couple divorced in 2002. They have two children: a son, Harold, the music producer/songwriter Levelsoundz, a graduate of Northeastern University; and a daughter, Annie, who graduated from Harvard and now works in marketing. Kincaid is president of the official Levelsoundz Fan Club.

Kincaid is a keen gardener who has written extensively on the subject. She is in 2005 a convert to Judaism.

Career overview
While working as an au pair, Kincaid enrolled in evening classes at a community college. After three years, she resigned from her job to attend Franconia College in New Hampshire on a full scholarship. She dropped out after a year and returned to New York, where she started writing for teenage girls' magazine Ingénue, The Village Voice and Ms. magazine. She changed her name to Jamaica Kincaid in 1973, when her writing was first published. She described this name change as "a way for [her] to do things without being the same person who couldn't do them — the same person who had all these weights". Kincaid explained that "Jamaica" is an English corruption of what Columbus called Xaymaca, the part of the world that she comes from, and "Kincaid" appeared to go well with "Jamaica". Her short fiction appeared in The Paris Review, and in The New Yorker, where her 1990 novel Lucy was originally serialized.

Kincaid is a writer, whose work has been both praised and criticized for its subject matter because it largely draws upon her own life, and her tone is often perceived as angry. Kincaid counters that many writers draw upon personal experience, so to describe her writing as autobiographical and angry is not valid criticism. Jamaica Kincaid was named the 50th commencement speaker at Bard College at Simon's Rock in 2019.

The New Yorker
As a result of her budding writing career and friendship with George W. S. Trow, who wrote many pieces for The New Yorker column "The Talk of the Town", Kincaid became acquainted with New Yorker editor William Shawn, who was impressed with her writing. He employed her as a staff writer in 1976 and eventually as a featured columnist for Talk of the Town for nine years. Shawn's tutelage legitimized Kincaid as a writer and proved pivotal to her development of voice. In all, she was a staff writer for The New Yorker for 20 years. She resigned from The New Yorker in 1996 when then editor Tina Brown chose actress Roseanne Barr to guest-edit an issue as an original feminist voice. Though circulation rose under Brown, Kincaid was critical of Brown's direction in making the magazine less literary and more celebrity-oriented.

Kincaid recalls that when she was a writer for The New Yorker, she would often be questioned, particularly by women, on how she was able to obtain her position. Kincaid felt that these questions were posed because she was a young black woman "from nowhere… I have no credentials. I have no money. I literally come from a poor place. I was a servant. I dropped out of college. The next thing you know I'm writing for The New Yorker, I have this sort of life, and it must seem annoying to people."

Talk Stories was later published in 2001 as a collection of "77 short pieces Kincaid wrote for The New Yorker'''s 'Talk of the Town' column between 1974 and 1983".

Recognition
In December 2021, Kincaid was announced as the recipient of the 2022 Paris Review Hadada Prize, the magazine's annual lifetime achievement award.

Writing
Her novels are loosely autobiographical, though Kincaid has warned against interpreting their autobiographical elements too literally: "Everything I say is true, and everything I say is not true. You couldn't admit any of it to a court of law. It would not be good evidence." Her work often prioritizes "impressions and feelings over plot development" and features conflict with both a strong maternal figure and colonial and neocolonial influences. Excerpts from her non-fiction book A Small Place were used as part of the narrative for Stephanie Black's 2001 documentary, Life and Debt.

One of Kincaid's contributions according to Henry Louis Gates, Jr, African-American literary critic, scholar, writer, and public intellectual, is that:

Themes
Kincaid's writing explores such themes as colonialism and colonial legacy, postcolonialism and neo-colonialism, gender and sexuality, renaming, mother-daughter relationships, British and American imperialism, colonial education, writing, racism, class, power, death, and adolescence. In her most recent novel, See Now Then, Kincaid also first explores the theme of time.

Tone and style
Kincaid's unique style has created disagreement among critics and scholars, and as Harold Bloom explains: "Most of the published criticism of Jamaica Kincaid has stressed her political and social concerns, somewhat at the expense of her literary qualities." As works such as At the Bottom of the River and The Autobiography of My Mother use Antiguan cultural practices, some critics say these works employ magical realism. "The author claims, however, that [her work] is 'magic' and 'real,' but not necessarily [works] of 'magical realism'." Other critics claim that her style is "modernist" because much of her fiction is "culturally specific and experimental". It has also been praised for its keen observation of character, curtness, wit, and lyrical quality. Her short story "Girl" is essentially a list of instructions on how a girl should live and act, but the messages are much larger than the literal list of suggestions. Derek Walcott, 1992 Nobel laureate, said of Kincaid's writing: "As she writes a sentence, psychologically, its temperature is that it heads toward its own contradiction. It's as if the sentence is discovering itself, discovering how it feels. And that is astonishing, because it's one thing to be able to write a good declarative sentence; it's another thing to catch the temperature of the narrator, the narrator's feeling. And that's universal, and not provincial in any way". Susan Sontag has also commended Kincaid's writing for its "emotional truthfulness," poignancy, and complexity. Her writing has been described as "fearless" and her "force and originality lie in her refusal to curb her tongue". Giovanna Covi describes her unique writing: "The tremendous strength of Kincaid's stories lies in their capacity to resist all canons. They move at the beat of a drum and the rhythm of jazz…" She is described as writing with a "double vision" meaning that one line of plot mirrors another, providing the reader with rich symbolism that enhances the possibilities of interpretation.

Influences
Kincaid's writing is largely influenced by her life circumstances even though she discourages readers from taking her fiction literally. To do so, according to the writer Michael Arlen, is to be "disrespectful of a fiction writer's ability to create fictional characters". Kincaid worked for Arlen, who would become a colleague at The New Yorker, as an au pair and is the figure whom the father in Lucy is based on. Despite her caution to readers, Kincaid has also said: "I would never say I wouldn't write about an experience I've had."

Reception and criticism
The reception of Kincaid's work has been mixed. Her writing stresses deep social and even political commentary, as Harold Bloom cites as a reason why the "literary qualities"  of her work tend to be less of a focus for critics. Writing for Salon.com, Peter Kurth called Kincaid's work My Brother the most overrated book of 1997. Reviewing her latest novel, See Now Then (2013), in The New York Times, Dwight Garner called it "bipolar", "half séance, half ambush", and "the kind of lumpy exorcism that many writers would have composed and then allowed to remain unpublished. It picks up no moral weight as it rolls along. It asks little of us, and gives little in return." Another New York Times review describes it as "not an easy book to stomach" but goes on to explain, "Kincaid's force and originality lie in her refusal to curb her tongue, in an insistence on home truths that spare herself least of all." Kate Tuttle addresses this in an article for The Boston Globe: "Kincaid allowed that critics are correct to point out the book's complexity. "The one thing the book is," she said, "is difficult, and I meant it to be." Some critics have been harsh, such as one review for Mr Potter (2002) that reads: "It wouldn't be so hard if the repetition weren't coupled, here and everywhere it occurs, with a stern rebuff to any idea that it might be meaningful." On the other hand, there has been much praise for her writing, for instance: "The superb precision of Kincaid's style makes it a paradigm of how to avoid lots of novelistic pitfalls."

In February 2022, Kincaid was one of 38 Harvard faculty to sign a letter to the Harvard Crimson defending Professor John Comaroff, who had been found to have violated the university's sexual and professional conduct policies. The letter defended Comaroff as "an excellent colleague, advisor and committed university citizen" and expressed dismay over his being sanctioned by the university. After students filed a lawsuit with detailed allegations of Comaroff's actions and the university's failure to respond, Kincaid was one of several signatories to say that she wished to retract her signature.

Bibliography

NovelsAnnie John (1985)Lucy (1990)The Autobiography of My Mother (1996)Mr Potter (2002)See Now Then (2013)

 Short fiction 
CollectionsAt the Bottom of the River (1983)
Stories

 "The Finishing Line" (1990), New York Times Book Review 18
 "Biography of a Dress" (1992), Grand Street 11: 92–100
 "Song of Roland" (1993), The New Yorker 69: 94–98
 "Xuela" (1994), The New Yorker, 70: 82–92

Non-fiction
 "Antigua Crossings: A Deep and Blue Passage on the Caribbean Sea" (1978), Rolling Stone: 48–50.
 "Figures in the Distance" (1983)A Small Place (1988)
 "On Seeing England for the First Time" (1991), Transition Magazine 51: 32–40
 "Out of Kenya" (1991), The New York Times: A15, A19, with Ellen Pall
 "Flowers of Evil: In the Garden" (1992), The New Yorker 68: 154–159
 "A Fire by Ice" (1993), The New Yorker 69: 64–67
 "Just Reading: In the Garden" (1993), The New Yorker 69: 51–55
 "Alien Soil: In the Garden" (1993), The New Yorker 69: 47–52
 "This Other Eden" (1993), The New Yorker 69: 69–73
 "The Season Past: In the Garden" (1994), The New Yorker 70: 57–61
 "In Roseau" (1995), The New Yorker 71: 92–99.
 "In History" (1997), The Colors of NatureMy Brother (1997)My Favorite Plant: Writers and Gardeners on the Plants they Love (1998), EditorTalk Stories (2001)
 My Garden (Book) (2001)Among Flowers: A Walk in the Himalayas (2005)
 

Children's booksAnnie, Gwen, Lilly, Pam, and Tulip (1986)

 See also 
 Caribbean literature

Interviews
 Selwyn Cudjoe, "Jamaica Kincaid and the Modernist Project: An Interview," Callaloo, 12 (Spring 1989): 396–411; reprinted in Caribbean Women Writers: Essays from the First International Conference, ed. Cudjoe (Wellesley, Mass.: Calaloux, 1990): 215–231.
 Leslie Garis, "Through West Indian Eyes," New York Times Magazine (October 7, 1990): 42.
 Donna Perry, "An Interview with Jamaica Kincaid," in Reading Black, Reading Feminist: A Critical Anthology, edited by Henry Louis Gates Jr. (New York: Meridian, 1990): 492–510.
 Kay Bonetti, "An Interview with Jamaica Kincaid," Missouri Review, 15, No. 2 (1992): 124–142.
 Allan Vorda, "I Come from a Place That's Very Unreal: An Interview with Jamaica Kincaid," in Face to Face: Interviews with Contemporary Novelists, ed. Vorda (Houston: Rice University Press, 1993): 77–105.
 Moira Ferguson, "A Lot of Memory: An Interview with Jamaica Kincaid," Kenyon Review, 16 (Winter 1994): 163–188.

Awards and honors
 1984: Morton Dauwen Zabel Award of the American Academy of Arts and Letters for At the Bottom of the River 1984: Shortlisted for the PEN/Faulkner Award for Fiction for At the Bottom of the River.
 1985: Guggenheim Award for Fiction
 1985: Finalist for the International Ritz Paris Hemingway Award for Annie John 1997: Shortlisted for the PEN/Faulkner Award for Fiction for The Autobiography of My Mother 1997: Anisfield-Wolf Book Award for The Autobiography of My Mother 1999: Lannan Literary Award for Fiction
 2000: Prix Femina étranger for My Brother 2004: American Academy of Arts and Letters
 2009: American Academy of Arts and Sciences
 2010: Center for Fiction's Clifton Fadiman Medal for Annie John 2011: Honorary Doctor of Humane Letters from Tufts University
 2014: Before Columbus Foundation American Book Award for See Now Then 2015: Honorary Doctor of Humane Letters from Brandeis University
 Lila Wallace-Reader's Digest Award
 2017: Winner of the Dan David Prize in Literature
 2021: Royal Society of Literature International Writer
 2022: The Paris Review Hadada prize for lifetime achievement

References

SourcesJamaica Kincaid: A Bibliography of Dissertations and Theses, .

Further reading
 J. Kincaid and B. Buckner, "Singular Beast: A Conversation with Jamaica Kincaid", Callaloo, vol. 31, no. 2, 2008.
 A. Vorda and J. Kincaid, "An Interview with Jamaica Kincaid", Mississippi Review, vol. 24, no. 3, 1996.
 F. Smith. "Review of 'Making Men: Gender, Literary Authority, and Women's Writing in Caribbean Narrative' by Belinda Edmondson", Research in African Literatures, vol. 32, no. 4, 2001.

External links

 Jamaica Kincaid, Voices from the Gaps, University of Minnesota
 Literary Encyclopedia biography
 "PEN 2013 Master/Class with Jamaica Kincaid and Ru Freeman", The Manle'', May 3, 2013
 Postcolonial Studies, Emory University: Jamaica Kincaid
 Jamaica Kincaid, BBC World Service
 Writers of the Caribbean, East Carolina University: Jamaica Kincaid 
 The Jamaica Kincaid Papers are held at Houghton Library, Harvard College Library.

1949 births
Living people
20th-century American non-fiction writers
20th-century American novelists
20th-century American women writers
21st-century American non-fiction writers
21st-century American novelists
21st-century American women writers
African-American Jews
African-American novelists
American Book Award winners
American garden writers
American women academics
American women non-fiction writers
American women novelists
Antigua and Barbuda emigrants to the United States
Antigua and Barbuda women writers
Antigua and Barbuda writers
Claremont McKenna College faculty
Converts to Judaism
Franconia College alumni
Harper's Magazine people
Harvard University staff
Jewish American novelists
Members of the American Academy of Arts and Letters
The New Yorker people
Novelists from New York (state)
Novelists from Vermont
PEN/Faulkner Award for Fiction winners
People from Bennington, Vermont
People from St. John's, Antigua and Barbuda
Prix Femina Étranger winners
Wesleyan University people
Writers from New York City
African-American women musicians
20th-century African-American women writers
20th-century African-American writers
21st-century African-American women
21st-century American Jews